GP Pascuas was a road bicycle race held annually in Pamplona, Spain. It was held from 1924 until 1983.

Winners

References

Cycle races in Spain
Recurring sporting events established in 1924
1924 establishments in Spain
Sport in Pamplona
1982 disestablishments in Spain
Defunct cycling races in Spain
Recurring sporting events disestablished in 1982